USS Thomas Jefferson may refer to the following ships of the United States Navy:

  was an attack transport in service from 1941 to 1949, and scrapped in 1974
  was an  ballistic missile submarine commissioned in 1963.  She remained on active service until 1985.

See also
 

United States Navy ship names